Christer Jönsson (born 16 August 1943) is a Swedish gymnast. He competed in seven events at the 1968 Summer Olympics.

References

1943 births
Living people
Swedish male artistic gymnasts
Olympic gymnasts of Sweden
Gymnasts at the 1968 Summer Olympics
Sportspeople from Helsingborg